Laura Bowman (October 3, 1881 – March 29, 1957) was an American stage, radio, and film actress.

Early life and stage career 
Bowman was born in Quincy, Illinois, and grew up in Cincinnati. She performed in In Dahomey in London with her common-law husband, Pete Hampton, in the early 1900s. She joined the Lafayette Players, a Harlem acting troupe, in 1916 and worked with them on and off for several years.

Filmography

References

External links 
 

1881 births
1957 deaths
20th-century American actresses
African-American actresses
American film actresses
American stage actresses
People from Quincy, Illinois
Actresses from Illinois
20th-century African-American women
20th-century African-American people